Gary C. Freeman (born July 25, 1948) is an American former National Basketball Association (NBA) player from 1970 to 1971.  He played in college for Oregon State University and was selected by the Milwaukee Bucks in the first round (16th overall) of the 1970 NBA Draft and by the Virginia Squires in the 1970 ABA Draft.

Freeman played in 41 games for the Milwaukee Bucks and 11 games for the Cleveland Cavaliers.

References 

1948 births
Living people
American expatriate basketball people in Belgium
American expatriate basketball people in the Netherlands
Basketball players from Idaho
Cleveland Cavaliers players
Milwaukee Bucks draft picks
Milwaukee Bucks players
Oregon State Beavers men's basketball players
Power forwards (basketball)
Sportspeople from Boise, Idaho
Virginia Squires draft picks
American men's basketball players

ZBV The Lions players
BV RZ players
Flamingo's Haarlem players
Liège Basket players